Prithviraj Chavan was sworn in as the Chief Minister of Maharashtra on November 11, 2010. The following is his cabinet. The government consisted of Chavan's Congress party and the Nationalist Congress Party.

The two parties had secured a majority of Maharashtra Legislative Assembly seats in the 2009 election, and a government under Congress' Ashok Chavan (No relation to Prithviraj Chavan) was formed. However, following graft allegation related to Adarsh Housing Society scam, Chavan resigned as the Chief Minister in November 2010. Subsequently, Prithviraj Chavan, then a Rajya Sabha member from Maharashtra, and Minister of State for Prime Minister's Office under Prime Minister Manmohan Singh, was chosen by the Congress to lead the Maharashtra government. He was sworn in on November 11, 2010, and subsequently, formed his only cabinet till date. The reasons cited for Chavan's appointment included his relatively corruption-free "clean image" and his lack of allegiance to any of the state's intra-party factions.

Chavan made some changes in his predecessor's cabinet, by including some new ministers and reshuffling portfolios. He also replaced Ashok Chavan's Deputy Chief Minister Chhagan Bhujbal with Ajit Pawar, who has since served as deputy to two more Chief Ministers.

The Chavan ministry served until its defeat in the 2014 Legislative Assembly election by the BJP and Shiv Sena.

Head Leader

Council of Ministers 
Prithviraj Chavan had never been a member of the state's Legislative Assembly. He had previously represented Karad in the Indian parliament's lower house from 1991 to 1999, and had been appointed to the upper house in 2002. A computer scientist by profession, Chavan had served as junior minister in the ministries of Science and Technology, Earth Sciences, Personnel, Public Grievances and Pensions, Parliamentary Affairs and as Minister of State for Prime Minister's Office. On his appointment as the Chief Minister, Chavan was elected to the State's upper house, the Legislative Council in April 2011.

Chavan appointed coalition partner NCP's Ajit Pawar as his Deputy Chief Minister. Pawar has since intermittently served as Deputy Chief Minister under both the state's next two Chief Ministers - Devendra Fadnavis (2019), and Uddhav Thackeray (Since 2019).

The cabinet consisted of 40 members, 20 each from the two coalition parties. The parties occasionally included independent members, utilizing their ministerial quotas.

Cabinet Ministers

Ministers of state

By Departments
An alphabetical list of all the departments of Maharashtra Government with terms : Cabinet Ministers

}}

Guardian Ministers

Ministers by Party

References 

Indian National Congress
2011 establishments in Maharashtra
2011 in Indian politics
C
Nationalist Congress Party